Shady Grove is an unincorporated community in Springdale Township, Washington County, Arkansas, United States. It is located in south Springdale, just northwest of Lake Fayetteville.

References

Unincorporated communities in Washington County, Arkansas
Unincorporated communities in Arkansas